Tallapalle is a census town in Adilabad district in the Indian state of Telangana.

Demographics

 India census, Tallapalle had a population of 10,937. Males constitute 52% of the population and females 48%. Tallapalle has an average literacy rate of 56%, lower than the national average of 59.5%: male literacy is 63%, and female literacy is 47%. In Tallapalle, 11% of the population is under 6 years of age.

References

Census towns in Adilabad district